Beaulieu-sur-Loire (literally Beaulieu on Loire) is a commune in the Loiret department in north-central France. It is the place of death of Jacques MacDonald, a French general who served in the Napoleonic Wars.

Population

See also
Communes of the Loiret department

References

External links

Official site

Communes of Loiret